The 1993 Canal Plus European Challenge was a professional non-ranking snooker tournament held by the WPBSA, which took place between 15 and 16 January 1993 in Epernay, France.

Stephen Hendry won the tournament, beating Tony Drago 5–3 in the final.

Main draw

References

European Challenge
1993 in snooker
1993 in French sport